Hoplocephalus is a genus of venomous snakes in the family Elapidae. The genus is endemic to Australia. Three species are recognized.

Description
Snakes of the genus Hoplocephalus have a pair of large grooved venom fangs, which are followed by two or three small maxillary teeth. The mandibular teeth are longest anteriorly. The head is distinct from the neck. The eye is rather small, with a round pupil. There is no loreal scale. The dorsal scales are smooth, without apical pits, and are arranged in 21 rows at midbody. The subcaudals are entire (undivided).

Species
The genus Hoplocephalus contains the following species which are recognized as being valid.
Hoplocephalus bitorquatus  – pale-headed snake 
Hoplocephalus bungaroides  – broad-headed snake
Hoplocephalus stephensii  – Stephens' banded snake

Nota bene: A binomial authority in parentheses indicates that the species was originally described in a genus other than Hoplocephalus.

References

Further reading
Wagler J (1830). Natürliches System der AMPHIBIEN, mit vorangehender Classification de SÄUGTHIERE und VÖGEL. Ein Beitrag zur vergleicheden Zoologie. Munich, Stuttgart and Tübingen: J.G. Cotta. vi + 354 pp. + one plate. (Hoplocephalus, new genus, p. 172). (in German and Latin).

 
Taxa named by Johann Georg Wagler
Snake genera
Taxonomy articles created by Polbot